Puyang railway station is a railway station in Hualong District, Puyang, Henan, China. It is an intermediate stop on the Shanxi–Henan–Shandong railway and the eastern terminus of passenger services.

On 18 March 2016, a passenger service was introduced. It consists of a single daily arrival from Zhengzhou followed by a single daily departure back to Zhengzhou. The journey times are uncompetitive with that of coaches.

See also
Puyang East railway station

References 

Railway stations in Henan